Montgomery Reservoir lies high in Colorado's Mosquito Range near Hoosier Pass a few miles north of Alma, Colorado. It is owned by Colorado Springs Utilities and delivers water to Colorado Springs, Colorado for municipal use. Built in 1957, the reservoir stores water from the Middle Fork South Platte River and from a tunnel that brings water from the Blue River on the west side of the continental divide.

Transbasin diversion
Most of the water entering the reservoir comes through the Hoosier Tunnel which collects water from the Blue River watershed on the west side of the continental divide and conveys it to the east side, an instance of a transbasin diversion. Because the reservoir lies near the top of the headwaters of the Middle Fork South Platte River, the watershed above the dam is rather small — only  in size, so its catchment basin is limited. Thus the chief source of the lake's water is the Hoosier Tunnel.

From there, the water is treated and delivered to municipal water customers in Colorado Springs.

Dam
Montgomery Dam is a rockfill structure. When it was built, the dam was sealed with an asphalt concrete facing.

References

Montgomery Reservoir
Bodies of water of Park County, Colorado
United States local public utility dams
Interbasin transfer